Morontobara was an ancient name for Manora Island, located In Karachi, Pakistan.

Alexander the Great camped to prepare a fleet for Babylonia after his campaign in the Indus valley; 'Morontobara' island (ancient Manora Island near Karachi Harbour), from where Alexander's admiral Nearchus set sail; and Barbarikon (Βαρβαρικόν), a port of the Indo-Greek Bactrian kingdom.

See also 
 Manora Island
 Manora Cantonment
 Manora Fort, Karachi
 Pakistan Naval Academy
 Karachi
 Pakistan Navy
 List of islands of Pakistan

References

External links 

Karachi-Wikioyage
 Pakistan Export Promotion Bureau mention of Manora
 pbase.com/waqas - Photos from Manora

Sindh
History of Karachi
Islands of Sindh